The 2nd Brigade (2 BDE) (known as 2nd (Eastern) Brigade until the 2012 reorganisation of the army) is a brigade of the Irish Army. The brigade headquarters are in Cathal Brugha Barracks in Dublin.

2nd Brigade provides security to various vital installations in its area of responsibility, including; Government Buildings, Áras an Uachtaráin (Residence of the President), foreign embassies, Dublin Airport, Dublin Docks (Dublin Port, Dún Laoghaire) and Knock Airport.

Units 
 Brigade HQ - Cathal Brugha Barracks, Dublin
 6 Infantry Battalion (Athlone)
 7 Infantry Battalion (Dublin)
 27 Infantry Battalion (Dundalk)
 28 Infantry Battalion (Ballyshannon)
 2 Artillery Regiment (Athlone)
 2 Cavalry Squadron (Dublin)
 2 Communication and Information Services Company (Dublin)
 2 Engineer Group (Athlone)
 2 Supply & Transport Group (Athlone)
 2 Ordnance Group (Athlone)
 2 Military Police Company (Dublin)

Barracks
 McKee Barracks, Dublin 7
 St Bricins Hospital, Dublin
 Gormanston Camp in Co. Meath
 Aiken Barracks, Dundalk
 Custume Barracks, Athlone
 Finner Camp in Ballyshannon

Training Facilities
 Gormanston Camp
 Kilbride Camp
 Glen of Imaal

References

Military units and formations of the Irish Army